New Lowell Airport  was located  northeast of New Lowell, Ontario, Canada.

References

Defunct airports in Ontario